TRX2 is a dietary supplement marketed for individuals with hair loss.  It is manufactured and sold by Oxford BioLabs in the United Kingdom, marketed in 2011.

Etymology
The name TRX2 is said to be derived from the Ancient Greek word trichos, meaning hair and the number 2 stands for second generation. The proper word for hair in Ancient Greek is however thrix (θρίξ).

Formulation
TRX2 contains amino acids and vitamins.  Its ingredients are L-carnitine, L-tartaric acid, potassium chloride,  L-leucine, isoleucine, valine, nicotinic acid, and biotin.

Product description
The product is a dietary supplement, not a drug, and hence it doesn't need to be approved by the U.S. Food and Drug Administration (FDA).

Clinical Studies
TRX2 has been tested by Oxford Biolabs in a clinical study. In the study, 59 male and female volunteers showing signs of alopecia completed 18 months of therapy, receiving either TRX2 or a placebo.

The results of the study showed that 26 (out of a total 29) participants who had taken TRX2 recorded an increase of at least 10% in the number of hair strands in the evaluation area and/or a 10% increase in hair weight.

The third-party studies took place in 2019 and were conducted by the European Research Institute Dermatest.

Controversy
In January 2014 the UK Advertising Standards Authority upheld a complaint against TRX2 and Oxford Biolabs, citing that advertisements that the company had run for TRX2 were misleading and in breach of EU advertising codes. The company agreed and changed their advertising in line with the code of conduct.

See also
 Thomas Whitfield
 Lonza

References

External links
 TRX2, Product Website

Dietary supplements